Neoparentia is a genus of flies in the family Dolichopodidae.

Species
 Neoparentia bicolor (Parent, 1954)
 Neoparentia bisetosa Robinson, 1967
 Neoparentia caudata (Van Duzee, 1917)
 Neoparentia deformis Robinson, 1967
 †Neoparentia chiapensis Bickel & Kraemer, 2016
 Neoparentia obscura Robinson, 1967
 Neoparentia schildi Robinson, 1967
 Neoparentia tarsalis Robinson, 1967

References 

Dolichopodidae genera
Sympycninae
Diptera of North America
Taxa named by Harold E. Robinson